Haxhi Krasniqi (born 1 April 1987), known as Robin Krasniqi, is a German professional boxer. He held the International Boxing Organization (IBO) light-heavyweight title from 2020 to 2021, the World Boxing Association (WBA) interim light-heavyweight title from 2020 to 2021, and the European super-middleweight title from 2018 to 2019.

Background
Krasniqi was born in Junik, Kosovo, but moved with his family to Munich, Germany, at a young age during the Kosovo War.

Professional career
Krasniqi made his professional debut on 20 October 2005, losing to Sven Haselhuhn in a four-round points decision. In his third fight, on 5 January 2006, he lost another four-round decision to Adrian Cerneaga. Krasniqi would spend the next seven years undefeated, winning two regional WBO light-heavyweight titles. On 20 April 2013, he made his first attempt at a world title, losing a twelve-round unanimous decision to WBO light-heavyweight champion Nathan Cleverly. A second opportunity at a world title came on 21 March 2015, this time against WBA light-heavyweight champion Jürgen Brähmer, who stopped Krasniqi in nine rounds.

On 10 October 2020, Krasniqi won the WBA interim and IBO light-heavyweight titles by scoring a third-round knockout against Dominic Boesel. Krasniqi's compatriot, former European heavyweight champion Luan Krasniqi (not related, but also a native of Junik) congratulated him on the win.

Professional boxing record

References

External links
 

Super-middleweight boxers
Light-heavyweight boxers
Kosovan emigrants to Germany
German people of Kosovan descent
1987 births
Living people
German male boxers
People from Junik
Kosovan male boxers
European Boxing Union champions
International Boxing Organization champions